Air Vice Marshal Allan Hesketh,  (5 July 1899 – 9 March 1973) was a senior Royal Air Force officer.

RAF career
Hesketh was commissioned into the Royal Air Force on 13 September 1918 during the First World War. He became officer commanding, No. 150 Squadron in March 1939 and served in the Second World War as base commander of No. 53 Base and then as base commander of No. 54 Base.

After the war he became Senior Air Staff Officer, No. 3 Group in December 1945, air attaché in Nanjing in October 1946 and Air Officer Commanding, No. 3 Group in December 1948. He went on to be  Air Officer Commanding, No. 23 Group in September 1951 and Air Officer Commanding, Headquarters, RAF Flying Training Command in April 1952 before retiring in July 1954.

References

1899 births
1973 deaths
Royal Air Force air marshals
Companions of the Order of the Bath
Commanders of the Order of the British Empire
Recipients of the Distinguished Flying Cross (United Kingdom)